Aaron Joseph Russell (born June 4, 1993) is an American professional volleyball player. He is part of the US national team, a bronze medalist at the Olympic Games Rio 2016 and the 2018 World Championship, 2015 World Cup winner. At the professional club level, he plays for JT Thunders.

Personal life
Aaron Russell grew up in Ellicott City, Maryland, U.S. His parents are Stewart and Marian Russell. Aaron was born the second of five boys. The other brothers are Peter (1992), Samuel (1995), Tim (1999) and Paul (2002). Peter also plays volleyball professionally. Russell was a top soccer player for Centennial High School in Maryland. The school did not have a boys’ volleyball team so he helped the girls’ team train while playing club volleyball at MVP (Maryland Volleyball Program). In 2015, he graduated from Pennsylvania State University. On July 30, 2017, he married former Penn State women's volleyball player Kendall Pierce, his college sweetheart.

Career
In 2015, he completed his volleyball career at Penn State, where he was named an AVCA First Team All–American in 2014 and 2015. All four years he helped Penn State reach the NCAA men's championship semifinals. Russell was a member of the Boys’ Youth Team in 2010 and 2011 and a member of the Men's Junior National Team in 2013. He made his debut with the senior national team in 2014.

In 2015, he joined his first professional team, Sir Safety Perugia.

In 2016, Russell took part in his first Olympic Games as a member of the United States Olympic team and won a bronze medal when the U.S. beat Russia in five sets. Russell was named one of the Best Outside Spikers of the tournament.

In June 2018, after 3 years spent playing for Perugia, Russell signed for another Italian team, Diatec Trentino. At the 2018 Club World Championship held in Poland, he was named the Most Valuable Player for his contribution to Diatec Trentino's 5th gold medal, the most by any club team in the history of the tournament.

Honours

Clubs
 CEV Champions League
  2016/2017 – with Sir Sicoma Colussi Perugia

 FIVB Club World Championship
  Poland 2018 – with Trentino Volley

 CEV Cup
  2018/2019 – with Diatec Trentino

 National championships
 2017/2018  Italian SuperCup, with Sir Safety Conad Perugia
 2017/2018  Italian Cup, with Sir Safety Conad Perugia
 2017/2018  Italian Championship, with Sir Safety Conad Perugia

Individual awards
 2016: Olympic Games – Best Outside Spiker
 2017: NORCECA Championship – Best Outside Spiker
 2017: Italian SuperCup – Most Valuable Player
 2018: FIVB Club World Championship – Most Valuable Player

College
 AVCA First Team All–American – 2014, 2015
 NCAA Championship All–Tournament Team – 2015
 Uvaldo Acosta Memorial EIVA Player of the Year – 2013, 2014, 2015
 EIVA First Team All–Conference – 2012, 2013, 2014, 2015
 EIVA Championship Most Outstanding Player – 2013, 2015
 EIVA Championship All–Tournament Team – 2012, 2013, 2014, 2015

See also
 List of Pennsylvania State University Olympians

References

External links

  
 
 
 Player profile at TeamUSA.org
 Player profile at LegaVolley.it 
 Player profile at Volleybox.net

1993 births
Living people
People from Ellicott City, Maryland
American men's volleyball players
Volleyball players at the 2016 Summer Olympics
Medalists at the 2016 Summer Olympics
Olympic bronze medalists for the United States in volleyball
Olympic medalists in volleyball
American expatriate sportspeople in Italy
Expatriate volleyball players in Italy
American expatriate sportspeople in Japan
Expatriate volleyball players in Japan
Penn State Nittany Lions men's volleyball players
Trentino Volley players
Outside hitters